Shuangzhai railway station is a railway station on the Qingzang railway. It serves Shuangzhai and is located 24 km from Xining railway station.

See also
List of stations on Qingzang railway

Railway stations in Qinghai
Stations on the Qinghai–Tibet Railway